Umaru (or Umar) was a Sultan of Kano who reigned from 1410-1421.

Biography in the Kano Chronicle
Below is a biography of Umaru from Palmer's 1908 English translation of the Kano Chronicle.

References

Monarchs of Kano